The Unfaithful Eckehart (German:Der ungetreue Eckehart) may refer to:

 The Unfaithful Eckehart (play), a play by  Hans Stürm 
 The Unfaithful Eckehart (1931 film), a German film directed by Carl Boese
 The Unfaithful Eckehart (1940 film), a German film directed by Hubert Marischka